The Lao League 2, is a football league representing the sport's second level in Laos.

Second level football leagues in Asia

Champions
2018 : Lao Army
2019 : Muanghat United
2020 : Lao Army
2021 : None
2022 : None

See also
 2022 Lao League 1
 2022 LFF Lao Ford Cup
 2022 LFF National Championship